Arthur le fantôme justicier ("Arthur the Ghost of Justice") was a French comic strip, created, written and drawn by Jean Cézard. It was first published in Vaillant #449 from December 20, 1953. The author drew the comic strip for the Pif Gadget magazine until he died in 1977.

The comic strip is about a ghost who fights crime and who can travel through time. It can be categorized as a humoristic comic strip.

The minimalism of the shapes was in strong contrast with the detailed and carefully consistent backgrounds and story. This is the first sketched comic strip of the author, and after it, he gave up on his realist artwork and created a few more comic strips: Les Rigolus et les Tristus, Surplouf le petit corsaire etc.

Return to comics
Between 1982 and 1988, new adventures were published, by the artist Mircea Arapu.

References

External links 

Mircea Arapu's page on BDOubliées.com
Pif Gadget - an interview with Mircea Arapu in connexionpif
Miguel Dao

French comic strips
French comics characters
1953 comics debuts
1977 comics endings
1982 comics debuts
1988 comics endings
Crime comics
Humor comics
Fantasy comics
Adventure comics
Comics about time travel
Historical comics
Fictional ghosts